The 38th century BC was a century which lasted from the year 3800 BC to 3701 BC.

Events

An earthquake near a Neolithic culture at Sotira in Cyprus destroys much of the local infrastructure.
Ubaid period came to an abrupt end in eastern Arabia and the Oman peninsula at 3800 BC.
In Syria, mass graves at Tell Brak, dating from c. 3800 to 3600 BC, have been unearthed, suggesting advanced warfare around this period.
 3800–2700 BC – Dolmen of Dombate (Galicia)
3800–3200 BC – 120 Wedge tombs (Ireland)
3760 BC – the first year of the Hebrew calendar
c. 3750 BC – Disintegration of the Proto-Semitic language

Calendar epochs

 25th of Elul, 21 September 3760 BC — Considered the first day of creation from formless matter (Gen. 1.2), traditionally interpreted as out of nothing, on which the Bible recalls that God created existence, time, matter, darkness and light.
 1st of Tishrei, 26 September 3760 BC — Considered the sixth day of creation (Rosh Hashanah Day 1), on which the Bible recalls that God created Adam and Eve.

See also
 3760

References

-2
-62